Iris Pruysen (born 26 November 1987) is a Dutch retired Paralympic athlete who competed in sprinting and long jump at international elite competitions. She is a World champion and a European bronze medalist in long jump. Pruysen lost her lower right leg following a gas explosion on a boat at a sailing camp in IJsselmeer. She had her leg amputated a few days later in Erasmus Hospital in Rotterdam.

References

1987 births
Living people
Sportspeople from Zwijndrecht, Netherlands
Paralympic athletes of the Netherlands
Dutch female sprinters
Dutch female long jumpers
World Para Athletics Championships winners
Medalists at the World Para Athletics European Championships
Athletes (track and field) at the 2012 Summer Paralympics
Athletes (track and field) at the 2016 Summer Paralympics
Dutch amputees
Sprinters with limb difference
Long jumpers with limb difference
Paralympic sprinters
Paralympic long jumpers
20th-century Dutch women
20th-century Dutch people
21st-century Dutch women